Kinkaid Township is one of sixteen townships in Jackson County, Illinois, USA.  As of the 2010 census, its population was 486 and it contained 227 housing units.

Geography

Unincorporated towns
 Crain at 
 Dry Hill at 
 Glenn at 
(This list is based on USGS data and may include former settlements.)

Adjacent townships
 Bradley Township (north)
 Ora Township (northeast)
 Levan Township (east)
 Sand Ridge Township (southeast)
 Fountain Bluff Township (south)
 Degognia Township (west)

Cemeteries
The township contains these Eight cemeteries: Bower, Glenn, Jones, Lee, McBride, McCormick, Talbott and Wilson.

Major highways
  Illinois Route 3

Demographics

School districts
 Trico Community Unit School District 176

Political districts
 Illinois' 12th congressional district
 State House District 115
 State Senate District 58

References
 
 United States Census Bureau 2007 TIGER/Line Shapefiles
 United States National Atlas

External links
 City-Data.com
 Illinois State Archives

Townships in Jackson County, Illinois
Townships in Illinois